George Dorris (born August 3, 1930) is an American dance historian, educator, editor, and writer. As managing editor of Dance Chronicle for thirty years, he laid foundations and established standards for dance scholarship not only in the United States but in many other countries of the world. In 2007, he was honored with a lifetime membership in the Society of Dance History Scholars and by the award for Outstanding Service to Dance Research presented by the Congress on Research in Dance.

Early life and education
George Edward Dorris was born into a prominent family in Eugene, Oregon, the son of Benjamin Fultz Dorris and Klysta (Cornet) Dorris. In 1892, his great-uncle George Dorris had purchased a farm in Springfield, about five miles for Eugene, and had experimented with various crops before establishing a hazelnut orchard in 1905. The mild weather, abundance of rain, and well-drained soil of the Willamette Valley provided ideal conditions for growing nut trees. Young George Dorris was not, however, interested in a career in the nut industry, being more attracted to languages and literature than to agriculture.

Accordingly, after graduation from high school in 1948, he studied Spanish and English literature at the University of Oregon in Eugene. Upon receiving his bachelor of arts degree a year early, he spent a year working in San Francisco, where he had opportunities to attend concerts, plays, and performances of opera and ballet. Thereafter, he enrolled in the graduate school of Northwestern University in Evanston, Illinois, to pursue his studies in Restoration and eighteenth-century English literature. In his second year he was awarded a university fellowship that paid his tuition and living expenses, and in 1955 he was awarded a Fulbright Scholarship for study in Italy. After some months there, he returned to Northwestern as a graduate assistant in the Department of English. While finishing his doctoral dissertation on poet, librettist, and translator Paolo Antonio Rolli (1687-1765) and the Italian circle in London, he took his first teaching jobs and was finally awarded a doctoral degree in 1962.

Academic career
Before completing his dissertation, Dorris began his professional career as an instructor of English literature at Duke University in North Carolina (1957-1960). He then moved on to Rutgers University in New Jersey (1960-1962), the University of the Pacific and its constituent Raymond College in California (1962-1964), and to Queen's College of the City University of New York (1964-1967). The remainder of his teaching career (1967-1998) was spent at York College, also a component of the City University of New York. There he rose from assistant professor to associate professor of English literature, teaching courses in Restoration and eighteenth-century drama, poetry, and prose as well as occasional courses in criticism and dance history.

In February 1965, after attending a performance of New York City Ballet, Dorris had the good fortune to meet the poet Jack Anderson, who was then working at Dance Magazine. Dorris had long been interested in dance, having seen programs presented by American Ballet Theater, Ballet Russe de Monte Carlo, the Royal Ballet of London, and the Martha Graham Dance Company. His interest in dance history increased upon meeting Anderson, who, along with their friend George Jackson, was also writing for the English magazine Ballet Today. In his academic field, Dorris had found that there was "not much new to say about John Dryden or Alexander Pope," but he came to realize that "there were enormous areas of dance just waiting to be discovered."

Avocation as dance historian
Following the lead of Anderson and Jackson, Dorris soon began contributing occasional reviews of dance performances to Ballet Today. Then, at a party in 1966, he met Arlene Croce, who had recently founded a magazine called Ballet Review, and he joined the ranks of its early contributors, thus beginning a long, distinguished career as a dance historian. He was encouraged in his endeavors by Selma Jeanne Cohen, a leading light in dance scholarship, who became a lifelong mentor and friend. Beginning in 1967, Dorris served for ten years as music editor for Ballet Review, and, eventually, as its regular reviewer of musical recordings (1993–present). In 1975, he joined the board of directors of Dance Perspectives Foundation as secretary, serving in that capacity until 1981. In 1977, Dorris and Anderson were the founding editors of Dance Chronicle: Studies in Dance and Related Arts, a journal published by Marcel Dekker that became the acknowledged leader in the field of dance scholarship. They continued to produce several issues a year—four at first, then three—until 2007, when they relinquished their roles to younger scholars.

During these years, Dorris was also active in several professional organizations focused on dance history and criticism. In 1978, he was a founding member of the Society of Dance History Scholars, for which he served on the board of directors (1979-1983, 1990-1993) and on the editorial board (2001-2004). He also served on the board of directors of the Dance Critics Association (1980-1983, 1996-1999) and the World Dance Alliance (1991-2012) and was a longtime member of the Congress on Research in Dance. He had a significant effect on the policies and direction of all these organizations, helping each one to move forward toward its stated goals.

In 1981, Selma Jeanne Cohen invited Dorris to become an associate editor of the International Encyclopedia of Dance, a major undertaking of the Dance Perspectives Foundation. As the area editor for dance from 1400 to 1800 and for Western music, he worked on the project for many years, until its successful publication in 1998. Soon after, he was invited to become one of a group of principal researchers for Popular Balanchine, a project of the George Balanchine Foundation devoted to documenting Mr. Balanchine's work on Broadway shows and Hollywood films, He completed his research on the operettas Rosalinda (1942) and The Merry Widow (1943) in 2002. Soon after, in 2005, he collaborated with Frank Andersen, artistic director of the Royal Danish Ballet, and Danish dance critic Erik Aschengreen in organizing a symposium held at the international festival in Copenhagen celebrating the two-hundredth anniversary of the birth of choreographer August Bournonville.

Selected writings
 Paolo Rolli and the Italian Circle in London, 1713-1744. The Hague: Mouton, 1967. The published version of his doctoral dissertation at Northwestern University.
 Numerous articles as music editor, Ballet Review. New York: Ballet Review, 1967-1977.
 "Music for the Ballets of John Weaver." Dance Chronicle 3.1 (1979), 46-60.
 "Massine in 1938: Style and Meaning." In Proceedings of the tenth annual conference of the Society of Dance History Scholars, University of California at Riverside, June 1988, pp. 200–211.
 "The Choreography of Robert Joffrey." Dance Chronicle 12.1 (1989), 105-139, and "A Supplement," 12.3, 383-385.
 Numerous articles as reviewer of recorded music, Ballet Review. New York: Ballet Review, 1993–present.
 "Don Quixote in the Twentieth Century: A Mirror for Choreographers." Choreography and Choreographers, special issue on Dance in Hispanic Culture, 3.4 (1994), pp. 47–53.
 "Leo Staats at the Roxy, 1926-1928." Dance Research (London) 13.1 (1995), 84-99.
 "Bernstein, Leonard," with coauthor Kenneth LaFaye, in International Encyclopedia of Dance, edited by Selma Jenne Cohen and others (New York: Oxford University Press, 1998), vol. 1, pp. 438–439.
 "Jean Börlin as Dancer and Choreographer." Dance Chronicle 22.2 (1999), 167-188.
 "The Choreography of Jean Börlin; A Checklist with the Tours and Personnel of Les Ballets Suedois." Dance Chronicle 22.2 (1999), 189-222.
 The Royal Swedish Ballet, 1773-1998. Edited and introduced by George Dorris. London: Dance Books, 1999.
 "Twenty-five Years of Dance Chronicle." With Jack Anderson as coauthor. Dance Chronicle 25.1 (2002), vii-viii.
 Summary essays on research: Rosalinda (1942) and The Merry Widow (1943, revival 1957), for Popular Balanchine, a project of the George Balanchine Foundation; dossiers submitted in 2002 and deposited in the Jerome Robbins Dance Division of the New York Public Library for the Performing Arts in 2005. See Popular Balanchine, Guide to the Dossiers, at http://balanchine.org/balanchine/03/pc.
 "Aaron Copland (1900-1990)," for America's Irreplaceable Dance Treasures, the First 100. Washington, D.C.: Dance Heritage Coalition, c.2003, published online 2012.
 "The Polish Ballet at the New York World's Fair, June 1939." Dance Chronicle 27.2 (2004), 217-234.
 "Dance and the New York Opera Wars, 1906-1912." Dance Chronicle 32.2 (2005), 195-262.
 "The Metropolitan Opera Ballet, Fresh Starts: Rosina Galli and the Ballets Russes, 1912-1917." Dance Chronicle 35.2 (2012), 173-207.
 "The Metropolitan Opera Ballet, Fresh Starts: Galli in Charge, 1919-1921." Dance Chronicle 36.1 (2013), 77-106.

Personal life
George Dorris and Jack Anderson, longtime companions, have traveled widely over the years and have made friends with dance historians in North America, South America, and Europe. They were married on July 22, 2008 in the Studio Theater on the campus of York University in Toronto, Canada. On February 12, 2015, in the company of friends and colleagues at their home in Greenwich Village in New York City, they celebrated the fiftieth anniversary of their first meeting and lifetime union.

See also
 Dance critique
 LGBT culture in New York City
 List of LGBT people from New York City

References

1930 births
Living people
American dance critics
American male journalists
21st-century American historians
American male non-fiction writers
Dance historians
Dance writers
American LGBT writers
LGBT people from Oregon
Northwestern University alumni
Writers from Eugene, Oregon
LGBT academics
21st-century American male writers